Patan Hospital is a teaching hospital for the Patan Academy of Health Sciences. Patan Hospital is one of the largest hospitals in Nepal. It uses modern equipment and facilities to provide treatment for almost 320,000 outpatients and 20,000 inpatients every year. Patan Hospital staff conduct more than 10,000 operations annually.

The hospital has been operating with an annual revenue of around US$3.5 million.

It serves people from every district of Nepal, from the remote villages as well as from the Kathmandu valley. Patan Hospital has 320 beds, which has increased to 450, after the completion of its maternity ward building construction.

Services offered
24-Hour Emergency Service
Inpatient Medical and Surgical care
Obstetrics and Gynecology
Birthing Center
Pediatrics
Orthopedics
Psychiatry
ENT
Dentistry
Dermatology
Intensive Care Unit
Outpatient Services
Emergency medicine service
General Practice clinics
Private Clinic
Pathology Services
Imaging and Radiology Services
Same Day Surgery
Community Outreach Programs

See also
This essay is also found in the spoken version:

References

Hospital buildings completed in 1982
Hospitals in Nepal
Medical education in Nepal
Teaching hospitals
1982 establishments in Nepal
Hospitals established in 1982